Pramila is a monotypic genus of moth in the family Sesiidae. Its only species, Pramila atkinsoni, occurs in the Bengal region of what was British India. Both the genus and species were first described by Frederic Moore in 1879.

References

Sesiidae
Moths of Asia